Dendroctonus brevicomis, the western pine beetle, is a species of crenulate bark beetle in the family Curculionidae. It is found in North America and parts of Mexico. It is known as a destructive pest of ponderosa and Coulter pine trees. When drought makes these pines more susceptible to infestations by D. brevicomis, there is an increased risk of forest fires due to dead trees.

Adult D. brevicomis are brown or black beetles 3-5 mm in length. Females carve lengthy egg galleries in the wood, damaging the trees.

References

Further reading

 
 

Scolytinae
Articles created by Qbugbot
Beetles described in 1876